The 2010–11 Australian Athletics Championships was the 89th edition of the national championship in outdoor track and field for Australia. It was held from 15–17 April 2011 at the Olympic Park Stadium in Melbourne. It served as a selection meeting for Australia at the 2011 World Championships in Athletics. This was the last competition to be held at the stadium before its demolition.

Several events were contested at different times and venues. The 10,000 metres event took place at the Zatopek 10K on 9 December 2010 at Lakeside Stadium in Melbourne, the decathlon and heptathlon were held in Perth on 31 March and 1 April 2011, the men's 5000 metres took place at the Melbourne Track Classic on 3 March 2011 and the women's 5000 metres was held as part of the Victorian Championships on 5 March 2011.

Medal summary

Men

Women

References

External links 
 Athletics Australia website

2011
Australian Athletics Championships
Australian Championships
Sports competitions in Melbourne
2010s in Melbourne